This article 2004 in motoring deals with developments in the automotive industry that occurred throughout the year 2004 by various automobile manufacturers, grouped by country.

United States
On 29 April 2004, the last Oldsmobile was produced. Due to declining demand for Oldsmobile cars, General Motors announced in December 2000 that the brand would be discontinued.

United Kingdom
Ford launched its new Focus, including 1.4 and 1.6 four-cylinder petrol units, a 1.6, 1.8 and 2.0 Turbo Diesel. Whilst in the US, the first generation model carried on.

Vauxhall reintroduced the Tigra nameplate with an all-new model based on the Corsa.

Germany
BMW has launched the 1 Series range, a five-door and three-door hatchback which replaced the BMW 3 Series (E46) Compact.

Mercedes-Benz CLS-Class was introduced. An all-new model in the form of a four-door coupé (fastback) that is based on the W211 E-Class.

France
Citroen released the new C4 available in a hatchback coupé or five-door at the 2004 Geneva Motor Show.

Peugeot launched the  407, a large family car available as a saloon, coupé and estate to replace the 406.

The Mégane Renault Sport was introduced to the fresh hot hatch market and includes a 2.0L turbo engine rated at 225 PS (165 kW; 222 bhp) at 5500 rpm and 300 N·m (220 lb·ft) at 3000 rpm.

Renault also introduced the Modus at the 2004 Geneva Motor Show, a mini MPV based on the Clio which is positioned as the smallest in Renault's MPV segment.

Australia
The Holden VZ Commodore is introduced as a facelift of the VY Commodore with minor exterior changes and a new Alloytec V6 engine.

See also
 2003 in motoring - the previous year
 2004 in motoring - the next year

Motoring by year
Motoring